HMS Southdown was a Type I  destroyer of the Royal Navy which served in World War II. She was scrapped in 1956.

Service history
Southdown was ordered on 11 April 1939 under the 1939 War Emergency Build Programme as job number J6602. She was completed in November 1940. She was adopted by the town of Woking in Surrey as part of Warship Week in 1942.

She earned battle honours during the Second World War for the North Sea 1941–1945, where she spent the majority of her service. In June 1944 she formed part of the Naval escort force in support of the Normandy Landings.

Following the war she was converted for use as an air target ship at Rosyth in September 1945. She then transferred to the Reserve Fleet at Portsmouth in April 1946. She remained there until sold to Thos. W. Ward for scrap. She arrived at the breakers yard at Barrow on 1 November 1956.

References

Publications
 
 

 

1940 ships
Hunt-class destroyers of the Royal Navy
Naval ships of Operation Neptune